Oreolalax nanjiangensis (Nanjiang toothed toad) is a species of amphibian in the family Megophryidae.
It is endemic to China. It is known from the area of the type locality of Mount Guangwu (光雾山), Nanjiang County, northern Sichuan, as well as adjacent southern Gansu and southwestern Shaanxi.
Its natural habitats are temperate forests and rivers.
It is threatened by habitat loss associated with tourism.

References

nanjiangensis
Amphibians of China
Endemic fauna of China
Taxonomy articles created by Polbot
Amphibians described in 1999